Wolfgang Jonas is a professor for design theory in the design-faculty at the HBK-Braunschweig, Germany.
He is a trained engineer in ship construction. His theories have influenced the latest developments in German "Designtheorie" - design theory.

Publications 

 Mapping Design Research: Positions and Perspectives (Board of International Research in Design) with Simon Grand, Birkhäuser Verlag GmbH, 
 Design Research Now: Essays and Selected Projects, Publisher: Birkhäuser Verlag GmbH  ( January 2007), 
 Positionen zur Designwissenschaft Taschenbuch – 9. Juni 2010,  Felicidad Romero-Tejedor with Wolfgang Jonas,

References

Links & articles 
 System theory as a framework for design research by Wolfgang Jonas https://www.academia.edu/430869/Systems_thinking_in_industrial_design
 http://www.transportation-design.org/cms/front_content.php?idart=226

Design educators
Academic staff of the Braunschweig University of Art
Living people
Year of birth missing (living people)